La Difesa della Razza (Italian: In Defence of Race) was a Fascist biweekly magazine which was published in Rome between 1938 and 1943 during the Fascist rule in Italy. Its subtitle was Scienza, Documentazione, Polemica. It played a significant role in the implementation of the racial ideology following the invasion of Ethiopia and the introduction of the racial laws in 1938.

History and profile
La Difesa della Razza was first published on 5 August 1938. It was established by the Office for the Racial Problems headed by Guido Landra. The founding director of the magazine was Giulio Cogni, but he left the post when he recognized that his ideas about races had been used by the Fascist leaders without making any reference to him. Cogni was replaced by Telesio Interlandi in the post. Giorgio Almirante served as its editorial secretary and was the assistant to Interlandi. The editorial board of the magazine included leading physicians and scientists. It came out biweekly. 

La Difesa della Razza was financed by several public institutions, including the Ministry of Popular Culture, banks, industrial and insurance companies. It folded on 20 June 1943 after producing 118 issues.

Ideology, content and contributors
The first issue of the magazine featured a manifesto, Manifesto della Razza, by the scholars which was the guiding principle of the racist ideology of Fascist Italy. Following the publication of this manifesto the approach of the state towards the Italian Jews and its colonial policies changed. The magazine described its goals in the first issue as follows:
We will popularize, with the help of scholars of various disciplines related to the problem, the fundamental concepts upon which the doctrine of Italian racism is based; and we will prove that science is on our side. 

It was a supporter of the cultural racism and Italian primitivism rejecting the premises of European modernism. Some of its contributors were Lino Businco, Luigi Castaldi, Elio Gasteiner, Guido Landra and Marcello Ricci who were scientific figures and published articles about biological racism. Guido Landra's articles were mostly concerned with hereditary diseases. The other frequent topic covered in the magazine was antisemitism. Not only Jews but also Black people were depicted in a negative manner in the magazine through photographs.

Circulation
Shortly after its launch La Difesa della Razza sold 150,000 copies per issue. However, from November 1940 its circulation significantly decreased because of the start of World War II.

References

External links

1938 establishments in Italy
1943 disestablishments in Italy
Biweekly magazines published in Italy
Defunct political magazines published in Italy
Fascist newspapers and magazines
Former state media
Italian-language magazines
Magazines established in 1938
Magazines disestablished in 1943
Magazines published in Rome
Propaganda newspapers and magazines
Antisemitism in Italy
Antisemitic publications